Nathan Thomas (born 22 January 1976 in Bridgend, Wales) is a Welsh former international rugby union footballer who played in the back row.

Thomas has played for various clubs during his career, including Bridgend, Bath, Cardiff Blues, Leeds Tykes, the Scarlets and Neath. He started for Bath in the victorious 1998 Heineken Cup Final as they defeated Brive.
He played 9 times for Wales between 1996 and 1998, his last being against South Africa.

In November 2009 he joined Gloucester on a short-term loan deal, but he did not make an appearance for them and now plays for their feeder club, Hartpury College. He is a lecturer at the college.

References

External links
Scarlets profile
Wales profile
Scarlets players sign extensions

1976 births
Living people
Bath Rugby players
Cardiff Rugby players
Gloucester Rugby players
Leeds Tykes players
Neath RFC players
Rugby union flankers
Rugby union number eights
Rugby union players from Bridgend
Scarlets players
Wales international rugby union players
Welsh rugby union players